The 2007 Ronde van Drenthe World Cup was the first UCI Women's Road World Cup running on the Ronde van Drenthe.
164 elite female cyclists took part in the race and 99 of them finished.

General standings (top 15)

Results from CQ ranking.

References

External links
 Official website

2007 in women's road cycling
2007 in Dutch sport
2007 UCI Women's Road World Cup
Ronde van Drenthe (women's race)